Emma Vasilyevna Gapchenko (24 February 1938 – 6 December 2021) was Russian archer. She won three gold medals at the world championships in 1969–73 and a bronze medal at the 1972 Olympics. At the European championships she won the team gold medal in 1970–74 and individual silvers in 1970 and 1974. She never won a Soviet title.

Gapchenko trained in running, swimming and volleyball before taking up archery at an advanced age of 28. After retiring from competitions she worked as an archery coach and judge.

She died on 6 December 2021, at the age of 83.

References

1938 births
2021 deaths
Russian female archers
Soviet female archers
Olympic archers of the Soviet Union
Olympic bronze medalists for the Soviet Union
Archers at the 1972 Summer Olympics
Olympic medalists in archery
Medalists at the 1972 Summer Olympics
People from Stupinsky District
Sportspeople from Moscow Oblast